Lalnghinglova Hmar (popularly Tetea Hmar, born on 9 October 1977) is a journalist and sports promoter in Mizoram, India. He works as the joint editor of Vanglaini, a leading daily newspaper in Mizo language. He is also currently the honorary secretary of Mizoram Football Association and Executive Committee member of the All India Football Federation. Through his journalism and sports activities, he has been credited with the revolution of football in Mizoram. He helped to establish the Mizoram Premier League, for which he is recognised as the father of Mizo football. 

Hmar contested at the 2019 Lok Sabha election from Mizoram constituency as an independent candidate but lost to C. Lalrosanga of the Mizo National Front party.

Early life and education
Hmar was born to H. Lalchhuanlina, a Mizoram Police Service officer, and Biakṭhuami. He is the second of four siblings, with two brothers and a sister. He studied at St. Paul's High School and then at Pachhunga University College, both in Aizawl. He completed his bachelor's degree ifrom St. Edmund's College, Shillong and earned his master's degree in history from the North Eastern Hill University, Shillong.

Career
After qualifying the University Grants Commission's National Eligibility Test, Hmar taught history at Pachhunga University College for two years. In 2001, he entered journalism and became the joint editor of the daily newspaper Vanglaini and the Revival Evangelical Weekly. He also serves as Joint Secretary of the Mizoram Olympic Association, and member of the Confederation of Indian Industry National Committee on Sports.

Football 
Hmar was elected as the honorary secretary of Mizoram Football Association uncontested in 2011, the position he continues to hold as of 2022. Hmar had declared that creating professional league was one of his major goals. He played a key role in establishing the Mizoram Premier League, the first regional domestic league within India, in 2012. MFA had no fund on its own or sponsor for the MPL, Hmar persuaded the local TV provider Zonet to join in the management. Zonet agreed a five-year deal as the sponsor with INR 2.5 million each year. MPL inspired the growth of Aizawl FC, the 2016-17 I-League champion. It was a national success as the Mizoram team under MFA won the national championship Santosh Trophy for the first time in 2014. MFA had produced the highest level licensed coaches including on A level, three B level, and 20 C level within five years of Hmar's leadership.

Hmar created official liaison with FIFA, which supported the All India Football Federation to organise Grassroots Football Project in Mizoram in 2012 for the first time in India. He also arranged with the German Football Federation the same year for football training in Mizoram from German coaches. He was also instrumental in starting Mizoram Futsal League, the first in India, with live telecast of Matches by Zonet TV.

Role in AIFF 
Hmar has been an executive committee member of the All India Football Federation since 2012. He also serves as Deputy Chairman of the League Committee under AIFF. In 2022, the Supreme Court of India constituted the Committee of Administrators for AIFF. Led by former judge A.R Dave, the committee consisted of seven members with Hmar among them. The committee was assigned to review and remake the AIFF constitutions.

Politics 
At the Indian parliamentary election for the 17th Lok Sabha in 2019, to contest for the sole seat from Mizoram constituency, Mizoram Pradesh Congress Committee (representative of the Indian National Congress), and Zoram People's Movement parties formed a coalition to compete C. Lalrosanga, a candidate of the state-ruling party Mizo National Front. MPCC and ZPM chose Hmar to be their jointly-supported candidate. Hmar contested as an independent candidate, and he was popularised with the campaign slogan as "Mipui Candidate" or the "People Candidate." Hmar's major objective was to fight against the Citizenship Amendment Act that was introduced by National Democratic Alliance, which was supported by MNF. Hmar lost to Lalrosanga by 8140 votes.

Personal life 
Hmar is a christian, and Presbyterian by denomination. He married Lalsangzeli with whom he has two daughters, Zosangi Hmar (born 2013) and Zochhuani Hmar (born 2015).

References

People from Aizawl
Living people
North-Eastern Hill University alumni
Mizo people
1977 births
Indian football executives
Indian sports executives and administrators